Brénod is a commune in the Ain department in eastern France

Geography

The river Albarine rises in the commune's northern part, then flows south through the commune; the village lies on the right bank of the river.

Population

See also
Communes of the Ain department

References

Communes of Ain
Ain communes articles needing translation from French Wikipedia